Jimmy Dodd may refer to:

 Jimmie Dodd (1910–1964), MC of the 1950s Walt Disney television series The Mickey Mouse Club
 Jimmy Dodd (footballer) (born 1933), footballer for Tranmere Rovers
 Jimmy Dodd (rugby union), English rugby union footballer

See also
James Dodd (disambiguation)
Jimmy Dodds (1914–1942), footballer